Mollycuddle was an alternative rock band from Minneapolis, Minnesota active from 1994 to 2000. 

A quartet composed of vocalist/guitarists Sara Aase and Tommy Kim, bassist Guy Lawhead, and drummer Judson Hildreth, the band was signed to Minneapolis label Guilt Ridden Pop. It released three albums, an EP and a split single with the band Pilot Light. 

City Pages writer Peter Scholtes described their music as "cranky dreampop" and singled out for praise their "affecting" 1998 ode to Law & Order actress Jill Hennessy, "The Ballad of Jill Hennessy." Colin Helms of CMJ New Music Report called them "shamelessly retro indie-pop" and called the song "Miracles", from their 1999 EP The Best Place For You, "the ideal demonstration of the band's feisty guitar change and melody-driven bounce." A reviewer for the White Plains, New York Journal News called It's Not You, It's Me "occasionally yummy but ultimately underwhelming" but said that "Aase's candy-glazed voice is irresistibly listenable." 

The band broke up in 2000 when Kim moved out of town to finish a Ph.D. dissertation.

Discography
Moment Resistance (1995, self-released)
 "King Me" b/w Pilot Light, "Chicken Bones" (split 7-inch single, 1998, Guilt Ridden Pop) 
Non-Fiction (1997, Guilt Ridden Pop)
It's Not You, It's Me (1998, Guilt Ridden Pop)
The Best Place For You (EP, 1999, Guilt Ridden Pop)
Paved With Good Intentions (2000, Guilt Ridden Pop)

External links
Mollycuddle page at Guilt Ridden Pop (Twin/Tone Records) website
[ Audio of "The Ballad of Jill Hennessy"]

References

Alternative rock groups from Minnesota
Musical groups established in 1994
Musical groups disestablished in 2000
Musical groups from Minnesota